Carthage Independent School District (Carthage ISD or CISD) is a school district based in Carthage, Texas (USA).
In 2009, the school district was rated "academically acceptable" by the Texas Education Agency.

Schools
Carthage High School (Grades 9-12)
Carthage Junior High (Grades 7-8)
Baker-Koonce Intermediate (Grades 4-6)
Libby Elementary (Grades 2-3)
Carthage Primary (Grades PK-1)

Athletics
The high school football stadium partially collapsed on September 29, 2006.  It was declared structurally unsound, and after a bond election approved funding a new stadium was completed in July 2008.  The new Carthage Bulldog Stadium has a seating capacity of 6,000.

References

External links
Carthage ISD

School districts in Panola County, Texas